Hacıisgəndərli (also, Dzhugutar”, Gadzhiiskenderli, Gadzhilzkendere, and Gadzhyiskenderli) is a village in the Davachi Rayon of Azerbaijan.  The village forms part of the municipality of Çaraq.

Notes

References 

Populated places in Shabran District